Mary-Estelle Mahuk (née Kapalu born 11 August 1966 in Tanna) is a Vanuatuan athlete.

Mahuk competed in three Summer Olympics for her country, at the 1992 Summer Olympics she competed in two events, in the 400 metres she finished 7th in her heat, then in the 400 metres hurdles she again finished 7th in her heat so in neither did she qualify for the next round. Four years later she went to Atlanta for the 1996 Summer Olympics, she entered the 400 metres hurdle and this time finished 6th in her heat but again failed to qualify, then she went to the 2000 Summer Olympics and in the 400 metres hurdles and this time she finished 5th in her heat. Mahuk reached the final and finished 7th in the 400 metres hurdles at the 1998 Commonwealth Games.

Competition record

References

External links
 

1966 births
Living people
Vanuatuan female sprinters
Athletes (track and field) at the 1982 Commonwealth Games
Athletes (track and field) at the 1986 Commonwealth Games
Athletes (track and field) at the 1992 Summer Olympics
Athletes (track and field) at the 1994 Commonwealth Games
Athletes (track and field) at the 1996 Summer Olympics
Athletes (track and field) at the 1998 Commonwealth Games
Athletes (track and field) at the 2000 Summer Olympics
Olympic athletes of Vanuatu
Commonwealth Games competitors for Vanuatu